The North West Liberties of Londonderry is a barony in County Londonderry, Northern Ireland. It is bordered by two other baronies in Northern Ireland. They are Tirkeeran to the east, across Lough Foyle; and Strabane Lower to the south. It also borders two baronies in County Donegal in the Republic of Ireland. It borders Raphoe North, to the south-west; and Inishowen West to the north.

Boundaries 
The boundaries of the North West Liberties of Londonderry consist of all parts of County Londonderry on the west bank of the River Foyle that is not a part of the City of Derry, and it borders County Donegal in the Republic of Ireland. The Liberties also historically included the shoreline of the east bank of the Foyle in addition. The original land of the Liberties originally was a part of County Donegal before being transferred to County Londonderry following a redistribution of land during the administration of the Kingdom of Ireland. The North West Liberties has only one administrative parish within it, the parish of Templemore  (also known as Temple Derry).

History 
The North West Liberties of Londonderry were established by The Honourable The Irish Society when they invested money to rebuild and expand the ruined town and monastic settlement of Derry, which had been destroyed in 1608, and enjoyed heavy influence over how the North West Liberties were run. There was originally doubt as to whether the freeholders of the North West Liberties of Londonderry were to be considered a separate barony from the City of Derry for election purposes. This was clarified in 1800 after an Act of the Parliament of Ireland affirming that freeholders from the North West Liberties of Londonderry were separate from the Londonderry County constituency and were entitled to vote in the Londonderry City constituency. The North West Liberties joined with the newly rebuilt and renamed City of Londonderry (also known as the City of Derry) in establishing a unified Town Watch in 1829, in an agreement that would eventually evolve to become the Londonderry Borough Police. The joint policing partnership between the city and the Liberties was later adsorbed into the jurisdiction of the Royal Irish Constabulary (RIC) following the abolition of the Londonderry Borough Police in 1870.

List of major settlements
Derry

List of civil parishes
Below is a list of civil parishes in the North West Liberties of Londonderry:
Templemore

References

Baronies of County Londonderry